Bubulo is a ward in Manafwa District in the east of Uganda.

Location

The Bubulo ward is in Manafwa Town Council, Bubulo West, Manafwa District, Eastern Region, Uganda. The Köppen climate classification is Am: Tropical monsoon climate.

History

At the end of the 19th century the Baganda leader Semei Kakungulu led his army into Bugisu against the Bangokho, then the Bawalasi and Bafumbo further north, and then south to Busoba where he built a fort named Nabumali. 
From here he raided into the mountains of southern Bugisu. 
In 1901 he created the county of Bubulo to be ruled by his lieutenants. 
Bukedi District was divided in 1924 into Budama (HQ Tororo), Bugisu (HQ Bubulo) and Bugwere (HG Mbale).

Notes

Sources

}

Populated places in Eastern Region, Uganda